Samotino (Bulgarian: Самотино) is a village in eastern Bulgaria. It is located in the municipality of Byala, Varna Province.

As of September 2015 the village has a population of 2 with only one permanent resident who lives off farming. The village is accessible only via dirt roads from the neighboring villages.

References
 http://www.grao.bg/tna/tab02.txt
http://www.guide-bulgaria.com/NE/varna/byala/samotino

Villages in Varna Province